Jafarabad (also Romanized as Ja‘farābād) is a village in Sardrud-e Sofla Rural District, Sardrud District, Razan County, Hamadan Province, Iran. At the 2006 census, its population was 570, in 136 families.

References 

Populated places in Razan County